Saeaga Airlines Sdn Bhd (doing business as Saeaga Airlines) was a regional airline operator, which operated in Sabah, Malaysia. The airline was established in 1995 and ceased its operations in 1998. It used to operate one Canadair Regional Jet CRJ100 and 2 de Havilland Canada Dash 8.

The Airlines planned to lease 10 A320s to expand its destination by September 1998 to West Malaysia (Kuala Lumpur, Langkawi) and 6 destinations in China, 2 in Australia, Hong Kong, Taiwan, Philippines and Indonesia before its financial collapse in April 1998 due to the Asian financial crisis.

Fleet 
Before Saeaga Airlines ceased its operations in 1998, the carrier fleet consisted of:

Historical Destination 
 Bintulu (Bintulu Airport)
 Kota Kinabalu (Kota Kinabalu International Airport)
 Kuching (Kuching International Airport)
 Layang-Layang (Layang-Layang Airport)
 Miri (Miri Airport)
 Mulu (Mulu Airport)
 Sibu (Sibu Airport)

References
 Air Transport Intelligence
 Airfleets.net

Defunct airlines of Malaysia
Airlines established in 1995
1995 establishments in Malaysia
Airlines disestablished in 1998
1998 disestablishments in Malaysia